Gabriel Iranyi (Hebrew: גבריאל אירני ; born 6 June 1946) is a Romanian-born Israeli composer.

Biography
Gabriel Iranyi was born in Cluj, Rumania. He immigrated to Israel at the age of 30.

References

1946 births
Musicians from Cluj-Napoca
Romanian Jews
Romanian emigrants to Israel
Israeli composers
Living people